Rama Rajasekhara (fl. 870/71 – c. 883/84 AD) was a Chera Perumal ruler of medieval Kerala, south India. Rajasekhara is usually identified by historians with Cheraman Perumal Nayanar, the venerated Shaiva (Nayanar) poet-musician of the Bhakti tradition.

Rajasekhara presumably succeeded Sthanu Ravi Kulasekhara around 870 AD. "Tripuradahana" and "Saurikathodaya", Yamaka poems by Vasubhatta, were composed under the patronage of Rajasekhara. Two temple records, from Kurumattur, Areacode and Thiruvatruvay, Vazhappally, mention king Rajasekhara. The former contain the only available "prasasti" of a Chera Perumal ruler of Kerala.

Rama Rajasehara probably abdicated the throne toward the end of his reign and became a Shaiva nayanar known as Cheraman Perumal Nayanar. He was succeeded by Vijayaraga (fl. c. 883/84-c.895 AD).

Sources 

Shankaravijaya of Vidyaranya mentions one Kerala king "Rajasekhara" (who was a contemporary of Hindu philosopher Shankara).
Shivanandalahari, attributed to Hindu philosopher Shankara, indirectly mentions the Chera ruler as "Rajasekhara".

 Rajasekhara is also tentatively identified with king "Co-qua-rangon" mentioned in the Thomas of Cana copper plates.

Rama Deva 
Laghu Bhaskariya Vyakhya, a mathematical commentary composed in the court of king Ravi Kulasekhara in 869/70 AD, mentions a Chera Perumal royal called Rama Deva, who marched out to fight the enemies on getting information from the spies. A possibility identifies Rama Deva with Rama Rajasekhara. Rama Deva is described as a member of the Solar Dynasty ("ravi-kula-pati") in Chapter IIII, Laghu Bhaskariya Vyakhya.

Patron of Vasubhatta 
Vasubhatta, the famous Yamaka poet of medieval Kerala, names his patron king as "Rama" in his Tripuradahana and Saurikathodaya. 

Tripuradahana refers to Rama Rajasekhara as follows:

Another poem by Vasubhatta, the Yudhisthiravijaya, says that "Kulasekhara" was the regnal title of his patron king. A later commentary on the poem Yudhisthiravijaya argues that "Rama" was the personal name of the king with regnal title "Kulasekhara". Modern scholars generally consider this a result of confusion on the part of the commentators (between Sthanu Ravi Kulasekhara and Rama Rajasekhara) who were separated in time from the Perumals. 

Some scholars also identify king Rama Kulasekhara as the patron of poet Vasubhatta (and thus placing Vasubhatta in 11th-12 centuries AD). This view is generally found unacceptable on several counts.

Epigraphic records

References

External links 

 Mathew, Alex - Political identities in History (2006) Unpublished Doctoral Thesis (M. G. University)

Nayanars
9th-century Indian monarchs
People of the Kodungallur Chera kingdom
Indian Shaivite religious leaders
Kodungallur Chera kings